Bernardo Sousa may refer to:

 Bernardo Sousa (rally driver) (born 1987), Portuguese rally driver
 Bernardo Sousa (footballer) (born 2000), Portuguese footballer